An Arirang bond is a won-denominated bond issued by a foreign entity in South Korea. The name refers to "Arirang," a Korean folk song. The market for Arirang bonds is extremely small, constituting less than 0.2% of corporate bond issuance in South Korea. The Asian Development Bank was the first to issue Arirang bonds, with a 1995 issue of ₩80 billion worth of seven-year bonds.

References 

Bonds in foreign currencies
Finance in South Korea